Mount Irving is a rural locality in the Toowoomba Region, Queensland, Australia.

Geography
Mount Irving is on the Darling Downs.

Road infrastructure
The Toowoomba–Cecil Plains Road runs along the southern boundary.

History
The locality takes its name from the nearby mountain, which in run was named for Clark Irving of Warra (also known Warra Warra) pastoral run.

References

Toowoomba Region
Localities in Queensland